Kul Sidhu (Kulvinder Kaur) is an Indian theatre, television and movie artist, who works in Punjabi cinema. She acted in the National Film Award-winning movie Anhe Ghore Da Daan (2011) playing the role of the wife of a rickshaw-puller, the protagonist of the movie. She has also acted in some short films including Nooran and Sutta Naag.

Biography
Born and brought up in Bathinda in Punjab, India, Kul Sidhu did her schooling from Kendriya Vidyalaya number 5 and graduation from Malwa College.

Television
Studio Bollywood, PTC Chak De - Anchor

Filmography

Web series

References

External links
 

21st-century Indian actresses
Living people
People from Bathinda
Actresses in Punjabi cinema
Indian women television presenters
Indian television presenters
Year of birth missing (living people)
Actresses from Punjab, India
Kendriya Vidyalaya alumni